Schale is a surname. Notable people with the surname include:

 Steve Schale, American political consultant
 Waltraud Schale, East German slalom canoeist